Bat coronavirus HKU10 is a species of coronavirus in the genus Alphacoronavirus.

References

Alphacoronaviruses